Ubiquitin-like 7 (bone marrow stromal cell-derived) is a protein in humans that is encoded by the UBL7 gene.

References

External links

Further reading